Christopher Aidan Penk (born 1980) is a New Zealand politician who has been a Member of Parliament in the House of Representatives for the National Party since 2017.

Personal life

Penk was born in West Auckland. He attended Kelston Boys' High School and graduated from the University of Auckland with a Bachelor of Arts in 1999. He joined the Royal New Zealand Navy, serving as an officer on HMNZS Te Kaha. He was an aide-de-camp for Governor-General Silvia Cartwright, before joining the Australian Defence Force for four years.

After his military career, Penk became a property lawyer. His father, Stephen, is an Associate Dean at the University of Auckland's Law School and his brother Alex is also a lawyer.

He married Newshub journalist Kim Choe; their first child was born shortly before the 2017 election.

Political career
In August 2014, Penk was selected to contest the Kelston electorate in the general election after the resignation of Claudette Hauiti. He placed second behind Carmel Sepuloni. Penk was ranked 68th on the National Party's party list and was not elected to parliament.

Member of Parliament

Penk won selection as National's Helensville candidate for the 2017 election, replacing former prime minister John Key. He won Helensville, defeating Labour's candidate Kurt Taogaga by margin of 14,608 votes. In his first term, he was a member of the parliamentary committees for transport and infrastructure; foreign affairs, defence and trade; and justice and the National party opposition spokesperson for courts.

During the 2020 New Zealand general election, Penk contested the Kaipara ki Mahurangi electorate, defeating Labour's candidate Marja Lubeck by a margin of 4,435 votes. He was appointed National's shadow attorney-general and elected chair of parliament's regulations review committee, which he held from November 2020 until October 2022.

In June 2021, in response to Winston Peters describing National Party members as "sex maniacs", Penk made a tweet saying Peters "is the real s*x maniac because he can f**k a whole country at once". Judith Collins said her office asked Penk to take down the tweet. Collins said "It's just simply inappropriate, we don't use that sort of language."

On 7 December 2021, after the election of Christopher Luxon as party leader, the National caucus elected Penk as its Senior Whip, thus making him the Chief Opposition Whip in the House of Representatives.

Political views 
In an interview before the 2017 general election, Penk self-described as "a social moderate... towards the conservative end [of the National Party]." He voted against the End of Life Choice Act 2019 and the Abortion Legislation Act 2020.

Penk was one of only eight MPs to vote against the Conversion Practices Prohibition Legislation Act 2022. He voted against it at its first reading in July 2021 (which then-party-leader Judith Collins instructed her MPs to do), for it at its second reading, and against it at its third and final reading in February 2022.

References

External links
 

|-

1980 births
Living people
New Zealand National Party MPs
Members of the New Zealand House of Representatives
People educated at Kelston Boys' High School
University of Auckland alumni
21st-century New Zealand lawyers
Royal New Zealand Navy personnel
Royal Australian Navy personnel
New Zealand MPs for Auckland electorates
Unsuccessful candidates in the 2014 New Zealand general election
Candidates in the 2017 New Zealand general election
Candidates in the 2020 New Zealand general election